Sawang Wirawong is a district (amphoe) in the central part of Ubon Ratchathani province, northeastern Thailand.

History
Sawang Wirawong was separated from Warin Chamrap district to create a minor district (king amphoe) on 1 April 1995.

On 15 May 2007, all of the 81 minor districts were upgraded to full districts. On 24 August the upgrade became official.

Geography
Neighboring districts are (from the north clockwise) Don Mot Daeng, Tan Sum, Phibun Mangsahan, Na Yia, Warin Chamrap, and Mueang Ubon Ratchathani.

Administration
The district is divided into four sub-districts (tambons), which are further subdivided into 53 villages (mubans). There are no municipal (thesaban) areas, and four tambon administrative organizations (TAO).

References

External links
amphoe.com

Sawang Wirawong